Martin James Gilbert FRSE (born 13 July 1955) is a British businessman, and the vice chairman of Standard Life Aberdeen and chairman of Aberdeen Standard Investments. He was chief executive (CEO) of Aberdeen Asset Management, an international investment management company, which he co-founded in 1983. He was chairman of FirstGroup from April 1995 to January 2014. He became a patron of The Aberdeen Law Project in 2010.

Early life
Born in Malaysia, Gilbert was educated at Robert Gordon's College, Aberdeen, and the University of Aberdeen and has an LLB in Law and an MA in Accountancy. He was in the same year of law school at the University of Aberdeen as Alistair Darling.

Career
Gilbert co-founded Aberdeen Asset Management in 1983.

Gilbert received an honorary doctorate from Heriot-Watt University in 2014 and was elected a Fellow of the Royal Society of Edinburgh in 2017.

In March 2017, a merger between Standard Life and Aberdeen Asset Management was announced. At the time, the merger created the UK’s largest asset management firm, and the second biggest in Europe.

In December 2019, Gilbert stepped down from the board of Standard Life Aberdeen (SLA) and is expected to leave SLA altogether in September 2020. In 2020, Gilbert was named as chairman of the Oil and Gas Technology Centre (OGTC), now the Net Zero Technology Centre, for the energy industry.

Personal life
Gilbert and his wife Fiona, professor of radiology at the University of Cambridge, have three children.

Notes

1955 births
Living people
People educated at Robert Gordon's College
Alumni of the University of Aberdeen
British chief executives
British corporate directors
Scottish businesspeople